Sutton on the Hill is a civil parish in the South Derbyshire district of Derbyshire, England.  It contains eight listed buildings that are recorded in the National Heritage List for England. Of these, two are at Grade II*, the middle of the three grades, and the others are at Grade II, the lowest grade.  The parish contains the village of Sutton on the Hill and the surrounding area.  The listed buildings consist of a church, tombstones in the churchyard and the lychgate, a house and associated structures, a farmhouse and a former watermill.


Key

Buildings

References

Citations

Sources

 

Lists of listed buildings in Derbyshire